Adia Benton is an American cultural and medical anthropologist whose research concerns how care is provided in humanitarian emergencies and development projects. Benton is currently an Associate Professor of Anthropology and African Studies at Northwestern University.

Education and career 
Adia Benton received a Bachelor of Arts in Human Biology from Brown University in 1999. She completed a Master of Public Health degree at Emory University in 2001. Benton did her doctoral work at Harvard University, completing an A.M. and Ph.D. in Social Anthropology in 2007 and 2009. 

In 2014, while Assistant Professor of Anthropology at Brown University, Benton was interviewed and contributed to several articles and discussions on the topic of Ebola.

Selected publications 

 "International Political Economy and the 2014 West African Ebola Outbreak", African Studies Review 58:1 (April 2015), 223 - 236 (DOI)
 HIV exceptionalism : development through disease in Sierra Leone, Minneapolis: University of Minnesota Press. 2015. ISBN 978-1452943848.
 "Ebola at a Distance: A Pathographic Account of Anthropology's Relevance", Anthropological Quarterly (George Washington University Institute for Ethnographic Research) 90:2 (Spring 2017), 495 - 524 (DOI)
"MOURNING, SURVIVAL, AND TIME: Writing through Crisis." In Writing Anthropology: Essays on Craft and Commitment, edited by MCGRANAHAN CAROLE, 140–42. Durham; London: Duke University Press. 2020. .

Awards 
In 2017, Benton won the Rachel Carson Prize for her book HIV Exceptionalism: Development Through Disease in Sierra Leone from the Society for Social Studies of Science.

References

External links 

 Adia Benton's Biography at Northwestern University

American anthropologists
African-American academics
American women academics
Science and technology studies scholars
Brown University alumni
Emory University alumni
Harvard University alumni
Northwestern University faculty
Medical anthropologists
Living people
American women anthropologists
1977 births
21st-century African-American people
21st-century African-American women
20th-century African-American people
20th-century African-American women